Jos Hansen (born 8 June 1932) is a Luxembourgian former footballer. He played in eight matches for the Luxembourg national football team from 1952 to 1954. He was also part of Luxembourg's team for the 1952 Summer Olympics, and for their qualification matches for the 1954 FIFA World Cup.

References

External links
 

1932 births
Living people
Luxembourgian footballers
Luxembourg international footballers
Place of birth missing (living people)
Association football forwards